
Publilius Syrus (fl. 85–43 BC), was a Latin writer, best known for his sententiae. He was a Syrian from Antioch who was brought as a slave to Roman Italy. Syrus was brought to Rome on the same ship that brought a certain Manilius, astronomer - not the famous Manilius of the 1st century AD (see Pliny, NH X, 4-5), and Staberius Eros the grammarian. By his wit and talent, Syrus won the favour of his master, who granted him manumission and educated him. He became a member of the Publilia gens. Publilius' name, due to the palatalization of 'l' between two 'i's in the Early Middle Ages, is often presented by manuscripts (and some printed editions) in corrupt form as 'Publius', Publius being a very common Roman praenomen.

Work
His  mimes, in which he acted, had a great success in the provincial towns of Italy and at the games given by Julius Caesar in 46 BC. Publilius was perhaps even more famous as an improviser. He received from Julius Caesar himself the prize in a contest, in which Syrus vanquished all his competitors, including the celebrated Decimus Laberius. 

His performances acquired the praise of many though he drew the ire of Cicero who could not sit through his plays.

All that remains of his corpus is a collection of Sententiae, a series of moral maxims in iambic and trochaic verse. This collection must have been made at a very early date, since it was known to Aulus Gellius in the 2nd century AD. Each maxim consists of a single verse, and the verses are arranged in alphabetical order according to their initial letters. In the course of time the collection was interpolated with sentences drawn from other writers, especially from apocryphal writings of Seneca the Younger. The number of genuine verses is about 700. They include many pithy sayings, such as the famous "iudex damnatur ubi nocens absolvitur" ("The judge is condemned when the guilty is acquitted"), which was adopted as its motto by the Edinburgh Review. Due to the fragmentary nature of the collections, many of the sayings are contradictory or do not make much sense. The original plays and characters they were written for are lost to time. Only two titles of his plays survive, Putatores (the Pruners) and a play amended to Murmidon.

Texts
As of 1911, the best texts of the Sentences were those of Eduard Wölfflin (1869), A. Spengel (1874), and Wilhelm Meyer (1880), with complete critical apparatus and index verborum; editions with notes by O. Friedrich (1880), R. A. H. Bickford-Smith (1895), with full bibliography; see also W. Meyer, Die Sammlungen der Spruchverse des Publilius Syrus (1877), an important work. His works were also translated into English by J. Wight Duff and Arnold M. Duff in 1934.

Quotes
Ignorance is bliss (In nil sapiendo vita iucundissima est)
It may not be right but if it pays think it so (quamvis non rectum quod ivat rectum putes)
The end justifies the means (honesta turpitudo est pro causa bona)
Deliberation teaches wisdom (deliberando discitur sapientia)
Deliberation often loses a good chance (deliberando saepe perit occasio)
Honor among thieves (etiam in peccato recte praestatur fides)
Least said, soonest mended (male dictum interpretando facius acrius)
No man is a hero to his valet (inferior rescit quicquid peccat superior)
Where there is unity, there is always victory (Ubi concordia, ibi semper victoria).
To call yourself happy is to provoke disaster (irritare est calamitatem cum te felicem voces)
Necessity gives the law without itself acknowledging one (necessitas dat legem non ipsa accipit) 
 Necessity knows no law
He gives the poor man twice as much good who gives quickly (inopi beneficium bis dat qui dat celeriter)

Titles of works
Putatores (lost)
amendation to Murmidon (lost)

Influence
Seneca the Younger strived to develop a "sententious style" like Publilius throughout his life. He quotes Syrus in his Moral Epistles to Lucilius in the eighth moral letter, "On the Philosopher's Seclusion" and the ninety-fourth, "On the Value of Advice".

William Shakespeare in the first scene of the fifth act of Much Ado About Nothing, has Don Pedro proverbially say: "if she did not hate him deadly, she would love him dearly." W.L. Rushton argues that this is derived from John Lyly's Euphues. If Shakespeare had not taken this from Lyly, then he and Lyly both derived this expression from Publilius.

Alexander Hamilton evidently felt some kinship to this writer as he often chose Publius as a pseudonym for his own writings, includinng for The Federalist Papers.

The Muddy Waters song Rollin' Stone (1950) was named after a proverbial maxim of Publilius: "A rolling stone gathers no moss". The phrase is also given as "Musco lapis volutus haud obducitur", and in some cases as "Musco lapis volutus haud obvolvitur". The British rock band The Rolling Stones in turn was named after Muddy Waters' song.

References

Sources

External links

Publilius Syrus in Latin at The Latin Library
Publilius Syrus in Latin at Bibliotheca Augustana
English translations of 63 quotations at the Quotations Page
The Moral Sayings of Publius Syrus, a Roman Slave, English translation published in 1856, with a Sketch of the Life of Syrus
Scaenicae Romanorum poesis fragmenta, Otto Ribbeck (ed.), 2nd edition, Leipzig, 1871, vol. 2 (Comicorum fragmenta), pp. 303 ff.

80s BC births
43 BC deaths
1st-century BC Romans
1st-century BC people
1st-century BC Latin writers
Ancient Roman actors
Ancient Roman comic dramatists
Ancient Roman writers
Golden Age Latin writers
Mimes
People from Antioch
People of Roman Syria
Syrus
Republican era slaves and freedmen
Syrian dramatists and playwrights
Syrian male actors
Syrian writers